Komarovo is a rural locality (a village) in Tukansky Selsoviet, Beloretsky District, Bashkortostan, Russia. The population was 10 as of 2010. There are 4 streets.

Geography 
Komarovo is located 86 km southwest of Beloretsk (the district's administrative centre) by road. Maygashlya is the nearest rural locality.

References 

Rural localities in Beloretsky District